Sam's West, Inc. (doing business as Sam's Club) is an American chain of membership-only retail warehouse clubs owned and operated by Walmart Inc., founded in 1983 and named after Walmart founder Sam Walton as Sam’s Wholesale Club. , Sam's Club ranks second in sales volume among warehouse clubs with $57.839 billion in sales (in fiscal year 2019) behind rival Costco Wholesale. 

, Sam's Club operates 600 membership warehouse clubs in the United States in 44 states, Puerto Rico and the U.S Virgin Islands. The only states where Sam's Club does not operate are Alaska (all three locations in that state closed in 2018 as part of a plan to close 63 clubs), Massachusetts (its last remaining location in that state, located in Worcester, closed in 2018 as part of a plan to close 63 clubs), Oregon, Rhode Island (the state's only location, in Warwick, closed in 2016 as part of a plan to close 269 stores globally, including four U.S. clubs), Vermont, and Washington (all three locations in that state closed in 2018 as part of a plan to close 63 clubs), as well as the District of Columbia. Walmart International also operates Sam's Club stores in Mexico and China. It has 167 locations in Mexico, and 39 in China. Grupo Big, formerly Walmart Brazil, which was de-consolidated from Walmart in August 2018, also operates Sam's Clubs in Brazil. From 2003 to 2009 Sam's Club had 6 locations in Canada.

On January 11, 2018, Sam’s Club announced the permanent closure of select stores. In a number of cases, employees showed up to work and found the doors locked and a notice saying that the store would soon be liquidated. Walmart eventually told Business Insider that 63 Sam’s Club stores would begin liquidating across the country, including in Alaska, Arizona, California, Illinois, New York, Ohio, and Texas.

According to Business Insider, the Sam's Club closings and plans to convert some stores into e-commerce fulfillment centers as announced in January 2018 are part of Walmart's growing commitment to online retailing that will allow it to better compete with rival Amazon.

History

Sam Walton opened the first Sam's Club on April 7, 1983, in Midwest City, Oklahoma, 21 years after he founded Walmart.

In 1987, Sam's Club made its first acquisition by purchasing West Monroe, Louisiana-based SuperSaver Wholesale Warehouse Club; the purchase expanded the chain by 24 locations.  The stores were owned by Alton Hardy Howard and his son John.

In 1989, Sam's Club entered New Jersey with a club in Delran in a former Two Guys/Jefferson Ward store. This was Walmart's first expansion into the Northeast. The first Walmart discount store (now expanded into a Supercenter) in New Jersey opened in 1991 in Turnersville. The company entered the Pennsylvania market in 1990.

In 1993, Walmart acquired PACE Membership Warehouse from Kmart and converted many (but not all) PACE locations into Sam's Clubs.

Sam's Club entered the Canadian market in Southern Ontario (all but one in the Greater Toronto Area/Golden Horseshoe) in 2003.

The latest flagship club opening , was in Fayetteville, Arkansas.

On September 24, 2006, Sam's Club unveiled a new logo with an updated serif font.

In December 2007, Sam's Club launched a new slogan, "Enjoy the Possibilities". Since then it became an official advertising slogan, mentioned in television and radio advertisements, but it is not mentioned on its website. , the "Enjoy the Possibilities" slogan was no longer in use. Sam's Club launched their latest slogan "Savings Made Simple" in the fourth quarter of 2009.

Starting in April 2007, there was speculation of a possible sale or spinoff of Sam's Club from parent company Wal-Mart Stores, Inc. At Walmart's 2007 annual shareholder's meeting in June, management said that Sam's Club is not for sale, although they did not say they are not considering a spinoff.

On February 26, 2009, Walmart Canada announced that it would be closing all six of its Canadian Sam's Club locations. This was part of Walmart Canada's decision to shift focus towards supercentres, but some industry observers suggested that the operation was struggling in competition with Costco and the non-membership The Real Canadian Superstore (known as Maxi & Cie in Quebec), that had a well-established history in the country. Sam's Club also rebranded the two as yet unopened locations as new Walmart Supercentres.  In January 2010, it was announced that ten clubs would be closing, including four in California. At the same time, Sam's opened six new clubs at various locations in the United States.

On January 24, 2010, it was announced that approximately 11,200 Sam's Club employees would be laid off. The layoffs resulted from the decision to outsource product sampling duties to an outside company (Rogers, Arkansas-based Shopper Events, which already performs in-store product demonstrations for Walmart) and to eliminate New Business Membership Representative positions throughout the chain. Most of the laid-off employees were part-time and represented about 10% of the total Sam's Club workforce.

Rosalind Brewer was named as the new CEO for Sam's Club, a change that came into effect on February 1, 2012.

On January 24, 2014, it was announced that Walmart will cut 2,300 jobs at the underperforming Sam's Club locations.

On February 1, 2017, John Furner replaced Brewer as CEO of Sam's Club.

On January 11, 2018, Walmart announced that 63 Sam's Club locations in cities including Memphis, Houston, Seattle, and others would be closing. Some of the stores had already liquidated, without notifying employees, some employees learned by a company-wide email delivered January 11. All of the 63 stores were gone from the Sam's Club website as of the morning of January 11, 2018. Walmart said that ten of the stores will become e-commerce distribution centers and employees can reapply to work at those locations. Business Insider magazine calculated that over 11,000 workers will be affected. On the same day, Walmart announced that as a result of the new tax law, it would be raising Walmart starting wages, distributing bonuses, expanding its leave policies and contributing toward the cost of employees' adoptions. Doug McMillon, Walmart's CEO, said, "We are early in the stages of assessing the opportunities tax reform creates for us to invest in our customers and associates and to further strengthen our business, all of which should benefit our shareholders."

On November 15, 2019, Kathryn McLay succeeded Furner as CEO of Sam's Club.

In Midland, Texas, a Sam's Club store was the site of a violent stabbing that wounded three family members, including two young children. The suspect, a 19-year-old who allegedly stabbed the family due to fearing they had symptoms of COVID-19, and were of Asian American descent. He was sentenced in 2022 to 25 years imprisonment.

Design
Like other warehouse clubs, Sam's Club sells most of its merchandise in bulk and directly off pallets. The clubs are arranged like warehouses, with merchandise stocked in steel bins. Products sold include jewelry, designer goods, sunglasses, crystal, and collectibles, electronics, floral, apparel, food, and meats. Most locations have Pharmacy, Tire and Battery, Photo (as of late 2019, photo was cut from most clubs), Bakery, Optical, Café, and Floral departments. Sam's Club markets items under the private labels Simply Right, Member's Mark, Bakers & Chefs, Daily Chef, Sam's Club, and Richelieu Foods, a private label manufacturer of frozen pizza, salad dressing, sauces, marinades, condiments, and deli salads. Sam's Club does not sell the Sam's Choice or Great Value brands that are available in Walmart stores.

Sam's Business Center
Sam's Club opened their first Business Center in Houston, Texas, in August 2008. Converted from an existing Sam's location, the Business Center is similar in concept to Costco's Business Centers.

In January 2010, the company announced it would be closing its Business Center, along with nine other clubs across the United States.

Other retail formats
In Houston, Sam's Club opened Más Club in August 2009, a club geared towards the Hispanic population. Membership in Más Club was separate from membership in Sam's Club. The store eventually began a liquidation sale in December 2013, and was closed in February 2014.

In October 2018, Sam's Club opened Sam's Club Now, a "mobile-first" retail store where customers use the Sam's Club Now mobile app to scan and pay for merchandise. Customers can also order items ahead of time with same-day curbside pickup at the store. The Sam's Club Now store is located in Dallas, TX.

Membership
Membership is required to purchase at Sam's Club (except at the cafe, eye exams in Optical, and the pharmacy where federal law prohibits sales of prescription drugs to members only, as well as liquor and gasoline in some states).  A 10% surcharge is added (except where forbidden by local laws, such as in Elmsford, NY, CA, SC) to the prices for non-members, except for alcohol items, cafe, and pharmacy items where available.  All memberships fees are 100% guaranteed at any point of time in the membership tenure.

Memberships can be renewed online, by mail, at the in-club Membership Services desk or any cash register, and at new ATM/Membership kiosks available in select locations.

In the United States, Sam's Club memberships are divided into two categories: Club and Plus, each with an annual fee. Plus is the more comprehensive membership plan, that includes Cash Rewards, extra savings in Pharmacy and Optical centers, free shipping on items purchased from their website, and (at some clubs) early shopping hours before the store is opened to the public.

Payment options and store credit products

Payment options
Sam's Club locations, as well as their online storefront (samsclub.com), accept Sam's Club (online and in-store) and Walmart credit cards (in-store only), American Express, Discover Card, MasterCard, Visa, debit cards (PIN-based, except MasterCard and Discover, which also can be signature-based), Sam's Club and Walmart and gift cards and egift cards, cash, or checks. , EBT SNAP benefits are accepted in-store. In the past, Visa credit cards were not accepted, except at gas stations because of the high processing fees compared with Walmart's discounted rates with MasterCard.

In 2016, Sam's Club rolled out a mobile application that allows users to scan items while they shop and pay for them, skipping the checkout line. By December 2016, the app could be used at all locations in the United States. In 2019, the dedicated scanning app was deprecated, and its features were incorporated into the main Sam's Club app.

Sam's Club credit cards
Sam's Club offers store credit lines to individuals and businesses linked to the member's membership card. As of June 2014, Sam's Club discontinued offering the Sam's Discover card and now offers a Sam's Club MasterCard or Sam's Club Consumer Card that can be used at Sam's Club. Both cards are issued by Synchrony Bank and the Sam's Club MasterCard is accepted anywhere MasterCard is accepted worldwide. Sam's Club MasterCard offers a cash back program of 3% for eligible purchases for Plus members (1% for Club members), 5% (Up to $6,000 a year then 1% thereafter) on gasoline, 3% on dining and travel and 1% on all other purchases.  Sam's Club is also the first merchant in the United States to offer EMV (Europay/MasterCard/Visa) chip-enabled cards.

Sam's Club car washes
Sam's Club offers car wash services at gas stations in 39 clubs as of October 15, 2019.

Backlashes from Chinese market 
Sam's Club is facing a boycott from some Chinese consumers due to taking Xinjiang-produced goods off the shelves. A number of Chinese consumers have already cancelled or suspended their membership cards.

See also
 Más Club
 Warehouse club

References

External links

 

1983 establishments in Oklahoma
American companies established in 1983
American corporate subsidiaries
Bentonville, Arkansas
Companies based in Arkansas
Defunct retail companies of Canada
Defunct supermarkets of Canada
Discount stores of the United States
Multinational companies headquartered in the United States
Online retailers of the United States
Retail companies established in 1983
Supermarkets of Mexico
Supermarkets of the United States
Walmart